The (Roman Catholic) Diocese of Udon Thani (Dioecesis Udonthaniensis) is in northeast Thailand. It is a suffragan diocese of the archdiocese of Thare and Nonseng.

The diocese covers an area of 50,046 km², covering five provinces of Thailand: Khon Kaen, Loei, Nongbua Lamphu, Nong Khai, and Udon Thani. As of 2001, of the 5.3 million citizens, 5,612 are members of the Catholic Church. It is divided into 56 parishes, having 31 priests altogether.

History
The Prefecture Apostolic of Udonthani was created on  May 7, 1953, when the Vicariate Apostolic of Thare was split. On December 18, 1965 the Prefecture Apostolic was elevated to a diocese.

Cathedral
The Cathedral of Our Mother of Perpetual Help (Thai: อาสนวิหารพระมารดานิจจานุเคราะห์) is located in Udon Thani town.

Bishops
Joseph Luechai Thatwisai, appointed November 14, 2009
George Yod Phimphisan, C.Ss.R.: October 2, 1975 - November 14, 2009 (resigned)
Clarence James Duhart, C.Ss.R.: 1953 - October 2, 1975 (resigned)

External links
Website of diocese
catholic-hierarchy.org

Udon Thani
Christian organizations established in 1965
Roman Catholic dioceses and prelatures established in the 20th century
Khon Kaen province
Loei province
Nong Bua Lamphu province
Nong Khai province
Udon Thani province
1965 establishments in Thailand